The Cinnamon Peeler is a lyric poem by Canadian writer Michael Ondaatje. The poem is about love but also about writing. The speaker of the poem travels through vastly different temporalities, wishing for different outcomes in a subjunctive past and settling on the hope given him as he is in dialogue with his memory. Speaking to someone (a memory) who is incapable of being touched, he is drawn more and more to other senses, to the words of his memory, which finally acknowledge that touching is impossible, by saying "I am the Cinnamon Peeler's Wife. Smell me." Smell being the critical sense here.

It is similar to another Ondaatje poem about turtles. 

Canadian poems
1991 books
Alfred A. Knopf books